The International Association of  Film and Television Schools (French: Centre international de liaison des écoles de cinéma et de télévision, CILECT) is the association of the world's major film and television schools. It was founded in Cannes in 1955 at the proposal of Marcel L’Herbier (IDHEC President) and Rémy Tessonneau (IDHEC General Director) who gathered together for the first time higher education film school representatives from France, Italy, Poland, Spain, UK, USA and USSR.

Its goals are to provide a means for the exchange of ideas among member schools, and to help them understand the future of education for creative personnel in film, television, and related media. It is dedicated to the creation, development and maintenance of regional and international co-operation among its member schools, and to the encouragement of film and television training in the developing world.

Regional organisations
The Groupement Européen des Ecoles de Cinéma et de Télévision / European Grouping of Film and Television Schools (GEECT) is the organization of CILECT's European members, including schools in Israel, Lebanon and Georgia.
CILECT Ibero América (CIBA) is the organization of Latin American film and Luso-Hispanic CILECT schools.
CILECT Asia-Pacific Association (CAPA) is the regional organization of the CILECT member schools in the Asia-Pacific Region.
CILECT Africa Regional Association (CARA) is the regional organization of the CILECT member schools in the African Region.
CILECT's North American Regional Association (CNA) is the regional organization of the CILECT member schools in Canada and the USA.
CILECT East Africa Regional Association (CEARA) is the regional organization of the CILECT member schools in the East African Region.

References

External links
 Official website

Film schools in France
Cannes
International cultural organizations
Organizations established in 1955
1955 establishments in France